Uraklino (Ükärle) is a rural locality (a village) in Baygildinsky Selsoviet, Nurimanovsky District, Bashkortostan, Russia. The population was 165 as of 2010. There are 4 streets.

Geography 
Uraklino is located 25 km southwest of Krasnaya Gorka (the district's administrative centre) by road. Churashevo is the nearest rural locality.

References 

Rural localities in Nurimanovsky District